Nicolas Kent Stahl (born December 5, 1979) is an American actor. Starting out as a child actor, he gained recognition for his performance in the 1993 film The Man Without a Face, co-starring Mel Gibson. 

He later transitioned into his adult career with roles in the films The Thin Red Line, In the Bedroom, Bully, Sin City, the HBO series Carnivàle, and the film Terminator 3: Rise of the Machines, in the role of John Connor. He also starred in the films Mirrors 2, Afghan Luke, Away from Here and as Jason Riley on Fear the Walking Dead.

Early life
Stahl was born in Harlingen, Texas, the son of Donna Lynn (née Reed), a brokerage assistant, and William Kent Stahl, a businessman. He was raised in Dallas along with his two sisters by his mother, who struggled to make ends meet.

Career

His first professional casting was in Stranger at My Door (1991), although he had been acting in children's plays since he was four years old. The 1993 film The Man Without a Face, co-starring Mel Gibson, helped boost his career at the age of 13. The following year, he had a supporting role in the ensemble film Safe Passage. In 1996, he played the role of Puck in Benjamin Britten's opera A Midsummer Night's Dream at The Metropolitan Opera in New York. In 1998 he played a doomed young soldier during the World War II Pacific War in The Thin Red Line. He scored critical and box office success again with his role in the 2001 movie In the Bedroom, which starred Sissy Spacek as his mother. He scored another box office hit in Terminator 3: Rise of the Machines (2003) as John Connor (replacing Edward Furlong in Terminator 2: Judgment Day), co-starring with Arnold Schwarzenegger and Claire Danes. In 2003, he starred in the HBO series Carnivàle, which drew a loyal audience as well as rave reviews. The show lasted two seasons, ending in 2006.

Stahl has played two villains to good reviews: Bobby Kent in the film Bully (2001) and Roark Jr./Yellow Bastard in Sin City (2005). Stahl did not reprise his role as John Connor in Terminator Salvation with Christian Bale taking over instead. Stahl noted the film's concept as "a jump to the future, so [John Connor] will be quite a bit older." Other roles included How to Rob a Bank (2007), Sleepwalking (2008), and Quid Pro Quo (2008).

In 2010, Stahl starred as Max Matheson in Mirrors 2, the sequel to Mirrors, directed by Victor Garcia and penned by Matt Venne. Among his more recent films are On the Inside (2010) and Afghan Luke (2011), and Away from Here (2014).

In 2019, Stahl portrayed serial killer Glen Edward Rogers in The Murder of Nicole Brown Simpson. Filming commenced over the summer in 2018 and the film was released in the UK on December 9, 2019. The film was based on Rogers' claim that he himself had killed Nicole Brown Simpson instead of O. J. Simpson, Brown's ex-husband and the primary suspect who had previously been tried and acquitted for the murder in 1995. The film was widely panned by critics.

In 2019, Stahl appeared in The Lumineers’ short film, III, which is based on their new album. Stahl played the character Jimmy Sparks, who is a father and gambling addict.

In November 2021, The Hollywood Reporter reported that Stahl would star alongside Sean Bean and Famke Janssen in the film Knights of the Zodiac, a live-action adaptation of the Saint Seiya manga series. The film will be released in 2023.

Personal life
Stahl married actress Rose Murphy in June 2009. They have a daughter, Marlo, born in 2010. They separated in 2012.

In May 2012, Stahl's wife reported him missing. It was later reported that Stahl had checked into rehab. On December 27, 2012, Stahl was arrested at an adult film store in Hollywood, California, on suspicion of committing a lewd act. No charges were filed due to insufficient evidence. On June 28, 2013, Stahl was arrested in Hollywood for alleged possession of methamphetamine.

In a 2017 interview at the Dallas Comic Show, Stahl stated he had moved to Texas and was taking a leave of absence from acting to concentrate on family and sobriety. Stahl returned to acting in 2018 when filming of The Murder of Nicole Brown Simpson began.

Filmography

Film

Television

Music videos

References

External links
 

1979 births
Living people
Male actors from Texas
American male child actors
American male film actors
American male stage actors
American male television actors
People from Plano, Texas
People from Harlingen, Texas
20th-century American male actors
21st-century American male actors